The Suprunov mill office is a renovated building on Budennovsky Avenue in the historical part of Rostov-on-Don. The mill's office was built at the end of the 19th century. It is listed as an object of cultural heritage of regional importance.

History 

In the place where the Suprunov mill was built, in 1863 the overlapping of the prospect by Baykovsky bridge was made. In 1884, many sections of the territory, that adjoined the bridge, were bought by citizens. One of them was MI Yelitser, who purchased a site that adjoined the western side of the avenue. In the 1890s he built a complex of a steam mill, which consisted of an office in two floors and industrial buildings. One more owner of these buildings was the brother of MI Elitser - II Elitser.

In 1904 the property was placed at the disposal of IA Suprunov. There was a mill on the first floor, and there were employees on the second floor. In the 1940s mill manufacturing facilities were destroyed, and the roof of the office was significantly damaged. But after the end of the war, repairs made it possible to use the building for housing and shops.

In the 21st century, the facade of the building was restored by Karp Babloyants on his personal initiative, having spent over 3 million rubles for the realization of the idea. For the preservation of the historical appearance of Rostov-on-Don, he received an award - a commemorative medal "185 years to Baykov Andrey Matveyevich". During the restoration work in 2012, the facade of the house was cleaned of paint, as a result of which they exposed the old masonry and practically returned to the house the kind that it had at the beginning of the 20th century.

Description 
The house belongs to the number of architectural monuments created in the Russian style. The peculiarity of the building is the expressiveness of architectural solutions. During the construction process, unscrambling was used - the central and extreme unscramblings were heavily decorated. The building consists of two floors, red brick was used for its construction.

References 

Tourist attractions in Rostov-on-Don
Buildings and structures in Rostov-on-Don
Cultural heritage monuments in Rostov-on-Don
Cultural heritage monuments of regional significance in Rostov Oblast